Peter Eugene Ball (19 March 1943) is an English sculptor.  He is best known for his religious work which can be seen in churches and cathedrals throughout Britain.  He also produces secular sculpture using predominantly driftwood and found objects.

Biography

Born on 19 March 1943 in Coventry, Warwickshire, Peter Eugene Ball attended Coventry College of Art from 1957 until 1962 where he obtained the National Diploma of Design.  By 1963 his sculptures were already included in mixed exhibitions in the Midlands and at the Marjorie Parr Gallery, London, where he had his first one-man exhibition in 1967.  However, it wasn't until 1968 that making sculpture became his full-time occupation, and since that time he has devoted himself to producing both religious work for churches and cathedrals throughout the country and exhibiting and selling his secular work in galleries across Europe and in America.

Religious commissions

Books

A Kind of Madness (The Sculptures of Peter Eugene Ball), Inga Gilbert
Icons of The Invisible God (Selected Sculptures of Peter Eugene Ball), foreword by Pamela Tudor-Craig, introduction by Richard Davey

External links
Official website - www.petereball.com

1943 births
Living people
Artists from Coventry
English sculptors
English male sculptors
20th-century British sculptors
21st-century British sculptors
21st-century male artists